Western Australian soccer clubs from the top three State-Based Divisions competed in 2008 for the WA State Challenge Cup, known that year as the Soccer Pools State Cup.  This knockout competition was won by Western Knights, their second title.

First round

All matches were completed by 6 April 2008.  A total of 32 teams took part in this stage of the competition. All 12 Clubs from the State League Premier Division and Football West State League Division 1, and 8 clubs from the Amateur Premier League (the top 8 out of 12 from the previous year's league table) entered into the competition at this stage.

Second round
A total of 16 teams took part in this stage of the competition. All matches were completed by 17 May.

Quarter finals

A total of 8 teams took part in this stage of the competition.  All matches in this round were completed on 21 June.

Semi finals

A total of 4 teams took part in this stage of the competition. Both matches in this round were completed on 20 August.

Final

The 2008 soccer Pools Cup Final was held on 4 October, and won by Western Knights, their second title.

References

External links

Football West State Cup
2008 in Australian soccer